is a Japanese manga series written and illustrated by Daiki Kobayashi. It has been serialized in Square Enix's Monthly Gangan Joker since March 2017, with its chapters collected into eleven tankōbon volumes as of August 2022. An anime television series adaptation by Silver Link is set to premiere in 2023.

Characters

Media

Manga
Ragna Crimson is written and illustrated by Daiki Kobayashi. The series began in Square Enix's shōnen manga magazine Monthly Gangan Joker since March 22, 2017. Square Enix has collected its chapters into individual tankōbon volumes. The first volume was released on October 21, 2017. As of August 22, 2022, eleven volumes have been released. 

In North America, the series is licensed for English release by Square Enix Manga & Books imprint.

Volume list

Anime
An anime television series adaptation was announced on March 19, 2022. It is produced by Silver Link and directed by Ken Takahashi, with scripts written by Deko Akao, and character designs handled by Shinpei Aoki. The series is set to premiere in 2023. At Anime Expo 2022, Sentai Filmworks announced that they licensed the series outside of Asia.

References

Further reading

External links
 
 

2023 anime television series debuts
Action anime and manga
Anime series based on manga
Dark fantasy anime and manga
Gangan Comics manga
Sentai Filmworks
Shōnen manga
Silver Link
Upcoming anime television series